Karanka is a Basque surname. Notable people with the surname include:

Aitor Karanka (born 1973), Spanish footballer and manager
David Karanka (born 1978), Spanish footballer and manager, brother of Aitor

Basque-language surnames